José Álava (born 26 June 1940) is a Spanish former sports shooter. He competed in the 25 metre pistol event at the 1968 Summer Olympics.

References

1940 births
Living people
Spanish male sport shooters
Olympic shooters of Spain
Shooters at the 1968 Summer Olympics
People from Vitoria-Gasteiz
20th-century Spanish people